The Carare-Opón Province is a former province of the Colombian Department of Santander.

References 

Santander Department